This is a list of manga that topped The New York Times Manga Best Seller list in 2016.

In January 2017, the Times decided to stop producing the separate manga best seller list.

See also
 The New York Times Fiction Best Sellers of 2016
 The New York Times Non-Fiction Best Sellers of 2016

References

2016
2016 in the United States
2016 in comics
The New York Times Manga Best Sellers of 2016